The Slovaks (Slováci in Slovak, slovaci in Romanian) are an ethnic minority in Romania, numbering 17,199 people according to the 2002 census and hence making up 0.1% of the total population. Slovaks mainly live in western Romania, with the largest populations found in Bihor and Arad counties, where they make up 1.22% and 1.25% of the population, respectively.

The largest concentrations of ethnic Slovaks can be found in Șinteu (Nová Huta), Bihor County, where they make up nearly all (96.37%) of the population, and in Nădlac (Nadlak), Arad County, where they make up almost half (43.85%) of the population. Other towns and communes with significant Slovak populations include:

Arad County
Peregu Mare — 12.87%
Olari — 4.07%
Sintea Mare — 4.94%
Fântânele — 3.36%
Vinga — 2.45%
Bihor County
Derna — 19.22%
Suplacu de Barcău — 18.41%
Popești — 12.93%
Mădăras — 7.03%
Aleșd — 6.18%
Lugașu de Jos — 6.28%
Aușeu — 5.63%
Brusturi — 4.64%
Aștileu — 4.35%
Sârbi — 2.68%
Caraș-Severin County
Berzovia — 1.69%
Satu Mare County
Certeze — 1.57%
Sălaj County
Plopiș — 32.01%
Sâg — 2.99%
Ip — 2.49%
Marca — 1.92%
Halmășd — 1.25%
Timiș County
Brestovăț — 15.13%
Chevereșu Mare — 4.44%
Topolovățu Mare — 2.48%
Tormac — 1.17%
Comloșu Mare — 1.07%

As an officially recognized ethnic minority, Slovaks, together with Czechs, have one seat reserved in the Romanian Chamber of Deputies.

See also 

 Romania–Slovakia relations
 Czechs of Romania

External links 
 Research for Your Slovak Roots in Romania
 The Czech and Slovak minorities in Romania

Romania
Ethnic groups in Romania